Athrips tigrina is a moth of the family Gelechiidae. It is found in Turkmenistan, Uzbekistan, China (Ningxia, Xinjiang) and Mongolia. The habitat consists of deserts.

The wingspan is 11–17 mm. The forewings are light cream with ochreous brown raised scales forming two distinct fasciae near the base, There are large prominent tornal and smaller subapical spots and there are grey scales in the subapical and costal areas. The hindwings are grey. Adults are on wing from the end of June to the end of September.

References

Moths described in 1877
Athrips
Moths of Asia